Jathedar Tota Singh (2 March 1941 – 21 May 2022) was an Indian politician who belonged to the Shiromani Akali Dal. He was Minister for Agriculture & NRI Affairs in the previous Punjab Government. He was Senior Vice President and Member, High Power Committee of Shiromani Akali Dal. He was also a Member of the Shiromani Gurdwara Parbandhak Committee. He also served as acting president of Shiromani Akali Dal after Surjit Singh Barnala when Barnala was appointed as Governor of Tamil Nadu in 1989.

Family and education
His father's name was Babu Singh. He completed his school education from his village school and for further studies he joined DM college Moga.

Political career
He was elected to the Punjab Legislative Assembly in 1997 on a Shiromani Akali Dal ticket from Moga. He was made Minister for Education in the Third Badal ministry during 1997–2002. He was re-elected from Moga in 2002. In 2012, he successfully contested from Dharamkot. He was cabinet minister and held portfolio of Agriculture & NRI Affairs. He also served at designation of Chairman Punjab Mandi Board 1985–1987 under Surjit Singh Barnala government. He was a continuous member of Shiromani Gurudwara Parbandak Committee (known as Sikh Parliament) for many years. He also served as acting president of Shiromani Akali Dal after Surjit Singh Barnala when barnala was appointed as governor of Tamil Nadu in 1989.

In 2017, Singh contested the assembly election from Dharamkot Assembly Constituency but was defeated by Sukhjit Singh (INC) who succeeded Singh as the MLA from Dharamkot.

References

1941 births
2022 deaths
Agriculture Ministers of India
Shiromani Akali Dal politicians
Indian Sikhs
Punjab, India MLAs 1997–2002
Punjab, India MLAs 2002–2007
Punjab, India MLAs 2012–2017
People from Moga, Punjab
Education Ministers of India